Julian David (born 23 December 1989 in Mannheim, Germany) is a German Schlager singer, actor and entertainer, who focuses in the pop song genre.

Career 
After graduating from secondary school, David attended the Bayerische Theaterakademie August Everding in Munich.  He graduated in 2010 with "very good" as a musical dancer.  David appeared at the Pfalztheater in Kaiserslautern in the musical The King and I, performed at the Bonn Opera in the musical Hair, in the musical Grease as "Danny Zuko" and as "Radames" in Elton John's Musical Aida.

David gained greater fame through his appearance in the cover band Voxxclub. by 2015, following their separation he received a recording contract with Electrola and produced Am Ende des Tages (at the end of the day)  as his first single.  The production of the debut album was taken over by Felix Gauder, songwriter Olaf Bossi worked five other songs with OLI Nova. addicted to friends was released on October 9, 2015 

Also in 2015, David was hired for the role of the "young man" for the movie Goblin 2.

In September 2015, David hosted his first TV show, for Sat.1 Gold .

Since 2017, David has hosted his own radio show on schlagersender Schlagerplanet Radio.  He also presents a weekly YouTube show, "Die Schlagerköche," in which cooks with other Schlagerstars.

In December 2017, David took part in the project 'Schlagerstars für Kinder' and sang the Christmas hit "Auf Einmal" with the group.  The hit was released in December and the proceeds went to children in need.

Discography

Albums 
 2015: Süchtig nach dir
 2019:  ohne limit

Singles 
 2015: "Am Ende des Tages"
 2015: "Hollywood"
 2015: "Verboten gut"
 2015: "Kerzenlicht und Mistelzweig"
 2017: "Spektakulär"
 2017: "Mein Kompass zu dir"
 2017: "Wir sind nie allein"
 2018: "Mondlicht"

References

External links 

 Offizielle Website
 YouTube Kanal "Schlagerköche"

1989 births
German folk singers
Living people
21st-century German male singers